The Drowning is a 2016 American-Hong Kong thriller drama film directed by Bette Gordon and starring Josh Charles, Julia Stiles and Avan Jogia.  It is based on Pat Barker's 2001 novel Border Crossing.

Plot
The Drowning tells the story of a forensic psychologist haunted by his expert witness testimony that sent a young boy to prison for a chilling murder. When the boy later reappears in his life, he is drawn into a destructive, soul-searching reinvestigation of the case.

Cast
Josh Charles as Tom Seymour
Julia Stiles as Lauren Seymour
Avan Jogia as Danny Miller
Tracie Thoms as Angela
John C. McGinley as Teddy
Leo Fitzpatrick as Angus MacDonald
Robert Clohessy as Captain Miller
Jasper Newell as Young Danny
Sam Lilja as Jeremy

Reception
The film has a 50% rating on Rotten Tomatoes.  Simon Abrams of RogerEbert.com gave the film one star.  Diego Semerene of Slant Magazine awarded the film half a star out of four.

References

External links
 
 

Hong Kong thriller films
American thriller drama films
Films based on British novels
2010s English-language films
Films directed by Bette Gordon
Films scored by Anton Sanko
2010s American films
2010s Hong Kong films